was a Japanese textile artist who specialized in making kimono dyed using the  technique of resist dyeing. He also created the  dyeing technique.

Biography 
 was born in  Prefecture on December 10, 1909. He apprenticed with  dyer  when he was 15.  took the artist name  in 1934, when he was 25. He then opened his own studio in 1939, though his business struggled due to anti-luxury measures implemented during World War II, and had to re-establish his studio in 1948.

 first exhibited at the Japanese Traditional Craft Exhibition in 1955, where he won third place. He was named a Living National Treasure in 1967. In 1971, he was awarded the Japanese Medal of Honor (purple ribbon), and was awarded the Order of the Rising Sun in 1982.

 died on February 20, 2008. His son, continues his father's work as a  kimono artist.

Style 
Though the  dyeing technique is typically used in the production of colourful designs and items, 's use of the technique was a notable departure from this. His designs, commonly taking inspiration from classical depictions of nature in traditional Japanese art, have a painterly feel to them.  was particularly well-known for his common use and depiction of chrysanthemums.

This method involves applying flakes of zinc-infused paste to fabric before resist dyeing it. When the paste is removed, it leaves a delicately spotted, mist-like pattern.

Museums that hold 's work include the Metropolitan Museum of Art, and the Los Angeles County Museum of Art.

References 

1909 births
2008 deaths
Japanese textile artists
Living National Treasures of Japan
Recipients of the Order of the Rising Sun
Recipients of the Medal of Honor (Japan)
20th-century Japanese people
21st-century Japanese people